The 1924 Paris–Roubaix was the 25th edition of the Paris–Roubaix, a classic one-day cycle race in France. The single day event was held on 6 April 1924 and stretched  from Paris to its end in a velodrome in Roubaix. The winner was Jules Van Hevel from Belgium.

Results

References

Paris–Roubaix
Paris–Roubaix
Paris–Roubaix
Paris–Roubaix